Goffrey A. 'G. A.' Hardaway, Sr. (born June 18, 1954 in Meridian, Mississippi) is an American politician and a Democratic member of the Tennessee House of Representatives representing District 93 since January 2013. Hardaway served consecutively from his special election March 13, 2007 until January 8, 2013 in the District 92 seat.

Education
Hardaway earned his BS in finance from DePaul University.

Elections
2012 Redistricted to District 93, Hardaway faced fellow Representative Mike Kernell in the August 2, 2012 Democratic Primary, winning with 2,927 votes (61.0%), and was unopposed for the November 6, 2012 General election, winning with 16,126 votes.
2007 When District 92 Democratic Representative Henri Brooks resigned and left her seat open, Hardaway was unopposed for the January 25, 2007 Democratic Primary, winning with 623 votes, and won the March 13, 2007 General special election with 1,405 votes (58.1%) against Republican nominee Richard Morton.
2008 Hardaway was challenged in the August 7, 2008 Democratic Primary, winning with 4,032 votes (73.3%), and was unopposed for the November 4, 2008 General election, winning with 14,819 votes.
2010 Hardaway was unopposed for both the August 5, 2010 Democratic Primary, winning with 5,579 votes, and won the November 2, 2010 General election with 8,254 votes.

References

External links
Official page  at the Tennessee General Assembly

G.A. Hardaway at Ballotpedia
G. A. Hardaway, Sr. at the National Institute on Money in State Politics

1954 births
Living people
African-American state legislators in Tennessee
DePaul University alumni
Democratic Party members of the Tennessee House of Representatives
Politicians from Memphis, Tennessee
Politicians from Meridian, Mississippi
21st-century American politicians
21st-century African-American politicians
20th-century African-American people